The ancient Diocese of Philae was a Christian see in Philae, Egypt.

List of Bishops
Makedonios, c. 346
Mark, c. 350s, banished to the Siwa Oasis by the Arian archbishop George of Cappadocia
Isaiah, c. 368
Psoulousia, c. 385
Unknown?
Danielios, c. 450
Unknown?
Theodoros, c. 520 – after 577 (established church within the Temple of Isis)
Unknown?
Pousi

References
Dijkstra, J. Harm F.: Religious encounters on the southern Egyptian frontier in Late Antiquity (AD 298-642).

Dioceses established in the 4th century